Hagen Reeck (born 6 September 1959) is a German football manager and former player.

References

German football managers
1959 births
Living people
FC Energie Cottbus players
Apollon Limassol FC managers